Balanga (pronounced ), officially the City of Balanga, is a 4th class component city and capital of the province of Bataan, Philippines. It is south of San Fernando, Pampanga (the regional city center) and northwest of Manila. According to the 2020 census, it has a population of 104,173 people. Balanga joined the UNESCO Global Network of Learning Cities in 2015.

History
Balanga was formerly a village of Abucay before it was established as a mission of the Dominican Order in the Provincial Charter of April 21, 1714, and later declared a vicariate on April 18, 1739, under the patronage of Saint Joseph. Upon the establishment of Bataan as a separate province in 1754, Balanga was made its capital by General Pedro Manuel Arandia due to its favorable location, at the heart of the new territorial jurisdiction.

The word Balanga originates from the Kapampangan word "balañga" (clay pot, or "banga" in Tagalog), which the town used to produce and which were among the best that can be found in the country.

On December 30, 2000, Balanga was inaugurated as a City by the Republic Act 8984 authored by Congressman Enrique "Tet" Garcia.

The city has extended its urban fringe to the west of Roman Superhighway and a new growth center in Barangay Tuyo has been delineated in the Comprehensive Land Use Plan. During the past years, the city saw a high record of residential growth. Consequently, with the expansion of the physical limits of the urban core, as well as the expected large increases in population, and the city's attractiveness to commercial and employment activities, the City Government of Balanga decided to undertake a Master Planning exercise and to propose various developmental projects that would establish Balanga as a well-planned community with quality and character that is innovative and special, although this is currently hindered by an unreliable electricity supply.

Geography

Balanga City is primarily a residential-agricultural city, with a rapidly growing commercial sector. It has a total land area of 11,163 hectares (8.13% of Bataan). It is located at the eastern part of the province of Bataan and lies in the southwestern part of Central Luzon. It is bounded inland by the municipality of Abucay in the north, Pilar in the south, the municipalities of Bagac and Morong in the west and Manila Bay in the east.

Climate

Barangays
Balanga is politically subdivided into 25 barangays.

Demographics

Economy

Agriculture and Fisheries
The City of Balanga has a total area of 5,698.99 hectares of land classified for agricultural use. 1,458.55 hectares of irrigated land, and 1,090.65 hectares upland, are utilized for crops production. In 2017, 8,144.42 metric tons of rice were produced.

The city classified 459 hectares of land to be utilized for aquaculture. It is composed of 148 hectares of coastal marine area, 276.6 hectares of brackish water fishpond and 34.4 hectares of freshwater fishpond. A total of 172 metric tons of marine products with an annual average of 5 metric tons per hectare are produced from freshwater fishponds with tilapia is the most common specie cultured. For brackish water fishponds, 968 metric tons are produced with an average of 3.5 metric tons per hectare. Some of the species cultured in brackish water are bangus (milkfish), sugpo, vannamei shrimp and alimango (mud crab).

Balanga is well-known for its smoked and dried fish products under the One Town One Product (OTOP) program.  For the year 2017, there are ninety-nine (99) fish processors in the city mostly located in villages of Tortugas, Sibacan, Puerto Rivas Ibaba and Villa Lina in Barangay Tenejero.

Commerce and services

The City of Balanga, while still predominantly agricultural is currently experiencing an accelerated growth in commercial sector. As capital of Bataan, it is the prime commercial hub in the province. Business enterprises are mainly wholesale and retail, servicing, construction, insurance, financing and manufacturing.  Retail and trading comprise the largest number of business establishments in this city. Several shopping centers are located in the city, notably SM City Bataan, Vista Mall Bataan, Waltermart Balanga, Capitol Square, Galeria Victoria, Center Plaza Mall, Recar Commercial Complex and Ocampo's Megastore. While Robinsons Place Balanga City's construction is expected to start this 2022.

In 2008, 80 hectares of the city’s central district was declared as "University Town" through City Ordinance No. 21, Series of 2008. It aims to encourage the development of Balanga as an emerging hub for start-ups and technology-related businesses in the Philippines.

Notable shopping malls and commercial centers include:
 SM City Bataan - Calero Street (Poblacion)
 Galeria Victoria - Paterno Street (Poblacion)
 WalterMart Balanga - Roman Superhighway (Tenejero)
 Vista Mall Bataan - Roman Superhighway (Cupang Proper)
 Capitol Square Mall - Capitol Drive (San Jose)
 Balanga City Public Market - Gen. Capinpin Street (San Jose)

Information Technology
The City is one of the twenty-five (25) emerging digital hubs identified by The Digital Cities 2025 program by the Department of Information and Communications Technology (DICT), Information Technology and Business Process Association of the Philippines (IBPAP), and Leechiu Property Consultants, Inc. (LPC). It hosts several business process outsourcing (BPO) companies such as Genpact, Boston-based start-up Botkeeper, and Australia-based Yoonet.

Public-Private Partnership
To further improve it's revenue generation capability, the City Government entered into several public–private partnership (PPP) projects, such as the Galeria Victoria, the Plaza Property which develops the city's main plaza, and the Capitol Square mall.

Government
Pursuant to the Local government in the Philippines", the political seat of the municipal government is located at the City Hall. In the History of the Philippines (1521–1898), the Gobernadorcillo is the Chief Executive who holds office in the Presidencia. During the period of American rule (1898–1946) (History of the Philippines (1898-1946)), the elected Mayor and local officials, including the appointed ones, hold office at the Municipal Town or City Hall. The legislative and executive departments perform their functions in the Sangguniang Panglungsod (Session Hall) and the Regional and Metropolitan Trial Courts, respectively, and are located in the second floor of the City Hall and in the Halls of Justice.

Elected officials
Mayor: Francis S. Garcia (National Unity)
Vice Mayor: Vianca Lita V. Gozon (National Unity)
Councilors:
Noel Valdecañas
Jett Nisay
Vic Baluyot
Elmo Sanchez
Hubert Pizarro
Karl Paguio
Joy Panganiban
Carding Magpantay
Tony Tranate
Benjie Meriño

Administration
The City administration envisions the City of Balanga as U-Town, a World Class University Town in 2020 (City Ordinance No. 21, Series of 2008, "Declaring the eighty point forty-two (80.42) hectares at the city's central district as University Town in the City of Balanga, Bataan").

Balanga listed a 'Record-Breaking' P6B Investments In 2012.
Balanga City won the 1st Robredo ICT Awards.

Former mayors

Tourism

Parks and Public Spaces

 Balanga Wetland Park - Puerto Rivas Ibaba
 Plaza Major de Balanga - Poblacion
 Bataan Capitol Center - San Jose
 Bataan Tourism Park - Tenejero
 Doña Francisca Public Park - Doña Francisca

Historical Places
 Surrender of Bataan Site Marker - Talisay
 Bataan World War II Museum - Talisay

Churches

 Balanga Cathedral (Diocesan Shrine and Cathedral Parish of St. Joseph) - 
 Divine Mercy Shrine of Diocese Balanga
 Santo Cristo Parish Church - Paterno Street, Cupang West
 San Roque Chapel - National Road, Tuyo
 The Risen Lord Chapel - Cuaderno Street, Doña Francisca
 Immaculate Conception Parish Church - Jose P. Rizal Street, Puerto Rivas Ibaba

Healthcare

Healthcare facilities
Access to health services in the city is adequate with the presence of one government owned general hospital and four private hospitals.

 Bataan Doctors Hospital and Medical Center - Cuaderno Street, Brgy. Doña Francisca
 Bataan General Hospital and Medical Center (a DOH regional hospital) - Manahan Street, Brgy. Tenejero
 Isaac Catalina Medical Center - Calero Street, Brgy. Poblacion
 Centro Medico de Santisimo del Rosario - Roman Superhighway, Tenejero
 Saint Joseph Hospital and Medical Center - Don Manuel Banzon Avenue, Brgy. Poblacion
 Balanga Medical Center (formerly Bataan Women's Hospital) - Palmera Street, Brgy. San Jose
 Balanga Medical Center-Four Lanes (under construction) - National Road corner E. Garcia Sr. Avenue, Tuyo

The City of Balanga also has one City Health Office (CHO) and four (4) functional PhilHealth-accredited Rural Health Units (RHU). RHU 1 in San Jose houses the Basic Emergency Maternal and New Born Care Facility. While the Newborn Screening (NBS) facility is located in RHU 3 in Barangay Cupang Proper. RHU 4 in Barangay Tenejero is the newest, established in March 2017. These government-owned facilities provide free pre-natal, delivery and post natal services, family planning, women’s health and safe motherhood counseling, control of diarrheal diseases, expanded program on immunization, control of acute respiratory illness, TB Dots clinic, diabetic clinic and STD AIDS social hygiene clinic. These are augmented by 22 smaller barangay health stations and one Dental Bus making health care more accessible to a greater number of the city residents. Numerous privately-owned medical facilities can also be found all over the city. These include 19 medical and 19 dental clinics, 14 laboratory and diagnostic centers and 10 beauty and skin care facilities.

Comprehensive Smoke-Free Policy
Being a Hall of Fame Awardee of the Department of Health’s Red Orchid Award, the City of Balanga is strictly implementing the Smoke-Free Policy. Regular anti–smoking campaign for colleges, university and schools, and orientation on health ordinances are conducted regularly across the city. The Comprehensive No Smoking Ordinance of the City of Balanga prohibits the sale, distribution, usage, and promotion of all tobacco products and electronic nicotine delivery system (ENDS) also known as "vape", within the declared University Town area and within the three (3) kilometers radius of the city.

To ensure and expand the city’s strong advocacy for 100% tobacco-free environment, the City Government launched the Tobacco-Free Generation (TFG) Campaign last December 2015. It is intended to secure the Millennials’ (those who were born from the year 2000 and onwards) commitment to not smoke. With this program, the City of Balanga was awarded with “World Health Recognition for Heath Cities Best Practice, Youth Engagement to Promote Tobacco Control” last August 29, 2016.

Education

Tertiary Education

Balanga City is the educational center of the province of Bataan. It currently has one state-owned university and several private colleges offering Baccalauréat degrees in accountancy, business administration, entrepreneurship, computer science and information technology, teaching, engineering, architecture, and health.

Bataan Peninsula State University, a state-owned institution, has its two biggest campuses located in the city: the main campus in the capitol compound, and a satellite campus located in downtown area.

Tomas del Rosario College is one of the oldest private educational institutions in the city. It is located in the Capitol Drive in Barangay San Jose. The other private colleges in the city include Asia Pacific College of Advanced Studies, Eastwoods Professional College of Science and Technology (formerly SOFTNET College of Science and Technology), Bataan Heroes Memorial College, Microcity Computer College and St. Joseph's College.

Other higher educational institutions in the city of Balanga include: AMA Computer Learning Center, Philippine Women's University-CDCEC Bataan, Bataan Maritime Institute, and Proclesia International Incorporated.

Secondary Education
The city hosts the biggest public secondary school in the province, Bataan National High School. Other public secondary schools present are Balanga City National Science High School, City of Balanga National High School and the Bataan Integrated School. While private secondary schools in the city include the high school departments of Asia Pacific College of Advanced Studies, Bataan Infant Jesus School, Bataan Montessori School, Inc., Tomas del Rosario College and St. Joseph Colleges of Balanga.

Notable personalities
Albert Garcia, 24th Governor of Bataan, former representative of Bataan's Second District, and former Mayor of Balanga.
Cesar Banzon Bautista, was the 13th Ambassador of the Republic of the Philippines to the United Kingdom and was the Secretary of Trade and Industry (Philippines) from 1996 to 1998.
Chito Jaime, Filipino professional basketball player who plays for the Muntinlupa Cagers of the Maharlika Pilipinas Basketball League and the Philippine Basketball Association.
Elisse Joson, Filipina actress, endorser, model and businesswoman
Janine Tugonon, Miss Universe 2012 1st runner-up 
Jose Enrique S. Garcia III, current representative of Bataan's Second District, and former Mayor of Balanga.
Jose Acuzar, also known as "Jerry" Acuzar, is a prominent real estate businessman. He founded and owns New San Jose Builders, Inc, Manuel L. Quezon University in Quezon City, and the renowned heritage resort Las Casas Filipinas de Acuzar. In July 29, 2022, newly elected President Ferdinand Marcos Jr. appointed him as Secretary of Department of Housing Settlements and Urban Development (DHSUD).
Jose Isidro Camacho, is an economist who served as the Philippines' Secretary of Energy and later on as Secretary of Finance under President Gloria Macapagal Arroyo. He is also a member of the Group of Experts of the ASEAN Capital Markets Forum, Singapore's Securities Industry Council, and the International Advisory Panel of the Securities Commission of Malaysia.
Julian Banzon, Filipino biochemist and National Scientist of the Philippines.
Leonila dela Fuente Dans, is a medical researcher and consultant. Her book, "Painless Evidence-Based Medicine", which she co-wrote with husband Dr. Antonio L. Dans and Dr. Maria Asuncion A. Silvestre, is a bestseller among rheumatologists. Her researches include “Randomized Controlled Trial and Cost Benefit Analysis-Zinc Implementation for Acute Diarrhea” for children less than five years old, and the “Utilization of Clinical Practice Guidelines in the Philippines.”
Luz Magsaysay, wife of Philippine President Ramon Magsaysay and the seventh First Lady of the Philippines.
Miguel Cuaderno Sr., was the 17th Finance Secretary of the Philippines under Manuel Roxas and the first Governor of the Central Bank of the Philippines from 1949 to 1960. He's also a constitutionalist being one of the “Seven Wise Men” who drafted the 1935 Philippine Constitution.
Norberto Gonzales, was the Secretary of National Defense (July 2, 2007 – August 7, 2007), and National Security Adviser (February 2005 – July 2, 2007)
Orlando Banzon Vea, commonly known as Doy Vea in the tech sector, co-founded Smart Communications along with David Fernando in 1991. He has since moved to several positions, including Chief Executive Officer, President and Director of PLDT Communications and Energy Ventures as well as CEO, President and Director of DigiTel (Sun Cellular).
Oscar Cruz, archbishop-emeritus of the Roman Catholic Church in the Philippines.
Oscar Joson, is the youngest Filipino to receive the US Congressional Gold Medal for bravery and sacrifice of own life. He was a 14-year old Boy Scout who died in Balanga during the early days of World War II.
Pedro Tuason, was the Solicitor General of the Philippines (1921), he also served as Justice Secretary during the administration of President Ramon Magsaysay (1953-1957).
Romi Garduce, first Filipino to climb the Seven Summits.

See also
Roman Catholic Diocese of Balanga

References

External links

 
Balanga City General Information
 [ Philippine Standard Geographic Code]
Philippine Census Information

 
1714 establishments in the Philippines
Cities in Central Luzon
Populated places established in 1714
Populated places in Bataan
Populated places on Manila Bay
Provincial capitals of the Philippines
Component cities in the Philippines